Bryce Homer Drew (born September 21, 1974) is an American college basketball coach and former player who is the head coach of the Grand Canyon Antelopes. Previously he served as the head coach of the Vanderbilt Commodores and in the same capacity at his alma mater, Valparaiso, having succeeded his father, Homer Drew. Drew has led his teams to the NCAA tournament on four occasions, including at least once at each of the three schools he has been the head coach of.

Bryce's brother, Scott, also coached at Valpo before becoming the head coach of the Baylor Bears. As a player, Bryce Drew was known for his buzzer-beating shot in the first round of Valparaiso's run in the 1998 NCAA tournament. He went on to play six seasons in the National Basketball Association (NBA) as a backup point guard for the Houston Rockets, Chicago Bulls, Charlotte Hornets and New Orleans Hornets.

High school career
After having been exposed to basketball for years through his father's head coaching position, Bryce played basketball as the point guard for Valparaiso High School in Valparaiso, Indiana.  As he progressed through high school though, Drew developed a rapid heartbeat, which required three surgeries to repair.  Despite this difficulty, he led his team to the state final game, and was named Indiana's Mr. Basketball of 1994.
He was also named the Gatorade Indiana Player of the Year his senior season in high school after guiding his team to a 28–1 season with the only loss coming in the state finals in overtime to the South Bend Clay High School Colonials.

College career
Though recruited by dozens of schools, Drew eventually decided to attend Valparaiso University, then a member of the Mid-Continent Conference, for men's basketball.  In his four years playing, Drew collected dozens of honors and records, including being ranked in the top 15 nationally in 3-point field goal and free throw percentage and leading the team to three consecutive conference regular season and tournament championships. He collected three conference tournament MVP awards, two conference MVP awards, and is Valparaiso's all-time 3-point field goal, and assist leader. He ranks second in points for Valparaiso, being passed by Alec Peters in 2017.

"The Shot"

During the 1998 NCAA Division I men's basketball tournament, 13-seed Valparaiso was facing 4-seed Ole Miss in the first round. Valparaiso was down 69–67 with 4.1 seconds remaining in the game and Mississippi's Ansu Sesay at the free throw line.  After Sesay missed both shots, the Crusaders came up with possession  from their basket, and 2.5 seconds remaining in the game.  On the inbound, the Crusaders used a play known as "Pacer". Jamie Sykes inbounded to Bill Jenkins, who passed the ball to Bryce Drew.  Drew made a 23-foot 3-point shot, giving him his 22nd point of the night, and clinching the Crusaders' 70–69 upset and advancing them in the tournament.  Drew proceeded to lead the defeat of 12-seeded Florida State 83–77 in overtime, with a 22-point game.  Drew and the Crusaders fell to 8-seeded Rhode Island by a score of 74–68, with Drew scoring  18 points.  Sports Illustrated would rank it the No. 5 sports moment of 1998.

Professional career

Following his rise to fame in the tournament, Drew was selected as Valpo's first-ever first-round pick as the 16th selection of the 1998 NBA draft by the Houston Rockets.  After playing with the Rockets for two years, Drew spent one season with the Chicago Bulls, and signed as a free agent for three seasons with the New Orleans Hornets (Charlotte Hornets during his first season with the team). Drew was then waived by the Hornets, and played professionally for the Valencia BC for a year.

Coaching career

Valparaiso
In the summer of 2005, Drew was selected as the new assistant coach of the Valparaiso University men's basketball team.  In 2006, Bryce was elevated to the position of associate coach, a promotion that Scott had also received in 2001 before taking over as head coach in 2002. When Homer Drew retired in May 2011, Bryce Drew was hired as the head coach. Drew was also honored as one of Valparaiso University's 150 Most Influential Persons in the University's history.

Vanderbilt
On April 6, 2016, after five seasons as Valparaiso's coach, Drew was hired by Vanderbilt to be their head coach. In his introductory press conference, he stated, "No Vanderbilt team has ever made it to the Final Four, and we would like to be that first Vanderbilt team."

The Commodores qualified for the NCAA tournament in his first year coaching at Vanderbilt in 2016–2017, narrowly losing to Northwestern in the first round. The team struggled the 2017–18 season, however, posting the first 20-loss season in school history.

Recruiting for the 2018–19 season showed promise as Drew signed 5-star recruits Darius Garland and Simisola Shittu, along with 4-star recruit Aaron Nesmith. Garland and Nesmith would later become NBA lottery picks, in 2019 and 2020, respectively. However, success in recruiting did not translate to success on the court. Garland, the team's starting point guard, was injured during a loss to Kent State, ending his season, and the Commodores went on to lose the final 20 games of its 2018–19 schedule, including going 0–18 in SEC play, becoming the first SEC team in 65 years to go winless in conference play since Georgia Tech went 0–14 in SEC competition in 1953–54. The best showing of the year for Vanderbilt was narrowly losing in overtime to AP #1 Tennessee Volunteers basketball 88–83.  On March 22, 2019, Vanderbilt fired Drew.

Grand Canyon
On March 17, 2020, Drew was hired as the head coach of Grand Canyon, replacing Dan Majerle.

On March 6, 2021, Drew coached Grand Canyon to its first WAC regular-season championship in school history. A week later, the Antelopes won the WAC tournament championship as well, earning their first trip to the 2021 NCAA Division I men's basketball tournament in the process.

Broadcasting career
After his termination from Vanderbilt, Drew joined ESPN as an analyst for its college basketball coverage. He spent the 2019–20 season mostly covering conference games between teams from the American Athletic Conference before leaving to take the head coaching job at Grand Canyon.

Personal life
Drew is the brother-in-law of former University of Toledo and Philadelphia 76ers basketball player, Casey Shaw. Drew's sister Dana is Shaw's wife. Shaw worked as an assistant coach under Drew at Vanderbilt.

Drew's wife, formerly Tara Thibodeaux, is a dancer and choreographer. She was a semi-finalist competing at the age of 15 in the V USA IBC International Ballet Competition held in 1994. In 2001 and 2002, she was a member of the  Atlanta Hawks NBA dance team.  She was awarded the prestigious Outstanding Choreographer Award at the 2017 Youth American Grand Prix in Chicago for her "Dying Swan" and has set choreography for Ballet Magnificat "The Arrival" and "Stratagem". She currently teaches and trains young dancers in Nashville. Tara is the daughter of Kathy Thibodeaux, an American ballet dancer and artistic director, and former child actor and musician Keith Thibodeaux, who portrayed Ricky Ricardo, Jr. ("Little Ricky") on the TV series I Love Lucy.

His brother, Scott Drew, is the basketball coach at Baylor University in Waco, Texas.

Drew is a Christian. Drew has said “I like building relationships and recruiting is building relationships. To be able to go into a young man's house and sit down with him to map out his future and then have them achieve those goals and dreams four years later is a great feeling. We love to help young men develop into Godly men and great husbands and hopefully win championships along the way.”

Head coaching record

References

External links
 Stats at Basketball-Reference

1974 births
Living people
American Christians
American expatriate basketball people in Italy
American expatriate basketball people in Spain
American men's basketball coaches
American men's basketball players
Basketball coaches from Indiana
Basketball players from Indiana
Charlotte Hornets players
Chicago Bulls players
College men's basketball head coaches in the United States
Grand Canyon Antelopes men's basketball coaches
Houston Rockets draft picks
Houston Rockets players
Liga ACB players
Medalists at the 1997 Summer Universiade
New Orleans Hornets players
People from Valparaiso, Indiana
Point guards
Basketball players from Baton Rouge, Louisiana
Universiade gold medalists for the United States
Universiade medalists in basketball
Valencia Basket players
Valparaiso Beacons men's basketball coaches
Valparaiso Beacons men's basketball players
Vanderbilt Commodores men's basketball coaches
Viola Reggio Calabria players